Guru Nanak Gurdwara Football Club is a football club based in Leicester, East Midlands, England.

History
GNG were formed in 1969 by a group of Sikh teenagers, naming the club after the Guru Nanak Gurdwara in Leicester. GNG's first game was a 4–3 win over Melbourne Hall in the Evington area of the city. GNG's early history was spent in the Leicester City League, before moving up to the Leicestershire Senior League. In 2015, GNG won Asian Football Club of the Year at the Asian Football Awards at Wembley Stadium. GNG entered the FA Vase for the first time in 2019–20.

Ground
The club moved into Riverside in 2014.

Records
Best FA Vase performance: First qualifying round, 2019–20

References

External links
Official website

Association football clubs established in 1969
1969 establishments in England
Football clubs in England
Sport in Leicester
Leicestershire Senior League
Leicester City Football League
Diaspora sports clubs in the United Kingdom
Diaspora association football clubs in England